Wilbur Frank Pell Jr. (December 6, 1915 – September 25, 2000) was a United States circuit judge of the United States Court of Appeals for the Seventh Circuit.

Education and career

Born in Shelbyville, Indiana, Pell received an Artium Baccalaureus degree from Indiana University Bloomington in 1937 and a Juris Doctor from Harvard Law School in 1940. He was in private practice in Shelbyville from 1940 to 1942. He was a special agent of the Federal Bureau of Investigation in Philadelphia, Pennsylvania and Birmingham, Alabama from 1942 to 1945, returning to private practice in Shelbyville from 1946 to 1970. He was a deputy state attorney general of Indiana from 1952 to 1955.

Federal judicial service

On January 23, 1970, Pell was nominated by President Richard Nixon to a seat on the United States Court of Appeals for the Seventh Circuit vacated by Judge John Simpson Hastings. Pell was confirmed by the United States Senate on April 23, 1970, and received his commission on April 24, 1970. He assumed senior status on July 31, 1984, and served in that capacity until his death on September 25, 2000, in Evanston, Illinois.

References

Sources
 

1915 births
2000 deaths
20th-century American judges
Federal Bureau of Investigation agents
Harvard Law School alumni
Indiana University alumni
Judges of the United States Court of Appeals for the Seventh Circuit
People from Shelbyville, Indiana
United States court of appeals judges appointed by Richard Nixon